The 2001 European Winter Throwing Challenge was held on 17 and 18 March at Stade Charles-Ehrmann in Nice, France. It was the first edition of the athletics competition for throwing events organised by the European Athletics Association. A total of 151 athletes from 22 countries entered the competition.

The idea behind the creation of the challenge was to provide a venue for throwing athletes to compete during the European winter months. Indoor track and field competitions almost unanimously exclude long-distance throwing events. While colder climates are suitable for cross country running, most throwing athletes lacked a competitive outdoor venue during this period of the year. As a resolution, the European Athletics Association proposed the hosting of a throwing event to be held each March in the warmer areas of the continent. The competition featured men's and women's contests in shot put, discus throw, javelin throw and hammer throw. Athletes were seeded into "A" and "B" groups in several events due to the number of entries.

Two national records were set during the competition, both in the women's hammer throw (an event which had only been added to the Olympic Games programme the previous year).

The inaugural edition of the event attracted a high calibre of participants, with ten Olympic or World Championships medallists in attendance. Three medallists in Nice went on to take medals on the global stage at the 2001 World Championships in Athletics later that year: women's shot put winner Vita Pavlysh was the world bronze medallist, while Olga Kuzenkova and women's discus winner Nicoleta Grasu were runner-up in their respective events.

Medal summary

Men

Women

Medal and points table

Participation

References

Results
1st European Winter Throwing Challenge Results. RFEA. Retrieved on 2013-11-17.

European Throwing Cup
European Cup Winter Throwing
International athletics competitions hosted by France
European Cup Winter Throwing
European Cup Winter Throwing
Sport in Nice
21st century in Nice
|European Cup Winter Throwing